Darren Mapp (born 8 October 1980 in Albury, New South Wales) is an Australian former professional rugby league footballer who last played for the Central Comets in the Queensland Cup.

Celtic Crusaders
In 2008, Mapp became captain of the Celtic Crusaders team.

In August 2009, Mapp, along with five team mates, was ordered to leave the United Kingdom after the UK Border Agency identified breaches to their visa conditions. Celtic Crusaders canceled Mapp's contract with immediate effect.

Career highlights
Junior Club: Moss Vale Dragons
First Grade Record: 64 appearances scoring 5 tries

References

External links 
Darren Mapp NRL Profile
Central Comets profile

1980 births
Living people
Australian rugby league players
Brisbane Broncos players
Canberra Raiders players
Cronulla-Sutherland Sharks players
Crusaders Rugby League players
Central Queensland Capras players
Rugby league props
Rugby league players from Albury, New South Wales